Cosmi Corporation (COSMI) is an American computer software company based in Carson, California.

Software publishing
Cosmi Corporation was established in 1982, founded by George Johnson. The company published titles for many Personal Computer systems such as the Atari 8-bit family, Commodore 64 and IBM PC. This included many games, such as Forbidden Forest, The President Is Missing, or the very popular Aztec Challenge. It also published utility software including a database, word processor, spreadsheet, street maps, vacation planners, a 3D World Atlas, and other tools.

Products 
Cosmi products include business and productivity, graphics and publishing, utilities, learning, languages, and games software.

Cosmi produces famous titles such as:

 Print Perfect Scrapbook Deluxe - Creates memorable scrapbook layouts, templates, designs, decorative artwork, and photo editing tools.
 mySkins iPod Video -  Styles and protects the surface of the iPod.
 Website Promoter - Contains tools that will drive traffic to a website, optimise rankings in key search engines, and boost site's popularity.

Recent activity
In recent years, Cosmi published shovelware sold at Best Buy and Office Depot. They still publish utility programs, such as Perfect Website Creator.

Cosmi published a version of OpenOffice.org called Platinum Perfect Pro Office System Software.

In 2012, Cosmi acquired ValuSoft from the now-defunct video game publisher THQ for an undisclosed sum.

References

External links

Video game companies established in 1982
Software companies established in 1982
1982 establishments in California
Software companies based in California
Carson, California
Companies based in Los Angeles County, California
Video game companies of the United States
Defunct software companies of the United States